Utter is a surname. Notable people with the surname include:

 Charlie Utter (1838–1912), American prospector
 Douglas Max Utter (born 1950), American painter
 George H. Utter (1854–1912), Governor of Rhode Island
 Harriet Utter (1816–1882), one of the first Euro-Canadian settlers on what became the site of Arkona, Ontario
 Lauren Utter (born 1985), Artist, Model, and contestant on Cycle 10 of America's Next Top Model
 Robert F. Utter (1930–2014), American jurist